Wellington Cândido da Silva Júnior (born 20 June 1989), commonly known as Wellington Júnior or sometimes Wellington, is a Brazilian football forward.

He played on 2009 FIFA U-20 World Cup.
He played there in four matches, one in a group stage and then in the quarter-final, semi-final and final.

References

1989 births
Living people
Brazilian footballers
Association football forwards
Brazilian expatriate footballers
Brazil youth international footballers
Expatriate footballers in Slovakia
Brazilian expatriate sportspeople in Slovakia
Expatriate footballers in Switzerland
Brazilian expatriate sportspeople in Switzerland
Campeonato Brasileiro Série D players
Slovak Super Liga players
Swiss Challenge League players
Brazil under-20 international footballers
Botafogo de Futebol e Regatas players
Duque de Caxias Futebol Clube players
FC Spartak Trnava players
Madureira Esporte Clube players
Bangu Atlético Clube players
FC Wil players
FC Biel-Bienne players
Associação Atlética Portuguesa (RJ) players
Associação Desportiva Cabofriense players
Sampaio Corrêa Futebol e Esporte players
Olaria Atlético Clube players
Macaé Esporte Futebol Clube players
Footballers from Rio de Janeiro (city)